5182 Aluminium alloy has magnesium and manganese as minor elements. 5182 Aluminium alloy is used in the automobile industry for making various parts of vehicles.

Composition

Mechanical properties

Thermal properties

Applications 
 Audi A8 (D2)’s structural panel 
 BMW Z8's inner panel 
 Rolls-Royce Phantom's structural panel 
  Aluminium can (top part)

Aluminium alloy table

References